Edge End High School was a secondary school for 11 to 16 year olds, in Nelson, Lancashire. The school closed in June 2006, as part of the project by the UK Government's Building Schools for the Future. Mansfield High School, in neighbouring Brierfield, also closed at the same time. The enrolled students from these two schools were merged into one, and the new Marsden Heights Community College is now the secondary school serving the area.

History 
Edge End opened on 10 October 1932 as Nelson Edge End Senior Boys' School. In 1948, it became Nelson Secondary Technical School, taking both boys and girls. It was renamed Edge End High School in 1972.

Description and location 

Edge End High School was a predominantly single storey school, but with two storey buildings to the rear. The school was located due west of the junction of Heights Road and Hibson Road in the Brierfield area of Nelson. There are residential properties at the front of the school on Hibson Road, and a derelict farm and Edge End Hall to the south.

This school was multicultural with predominantly Muslim children attending. Martin Burgess was the Headteacher in the 1990s until its closure in 2006. Edge End High School was the first public non-religious school in Lancashire to hold faith meetings every Friday and to build separate toilets where Muslims could perform ablution (wudhu) and pray the Friday Jumma prayer in school.

The school was demolished in 2010 and now St Paul's Primary school is built there.

Notable former pupils
 David Fishwick, who founded Burnley Savings and Loans
 Lee Ingleby, actor, inspired by drama teacher Brian Wellock, known for Line of Duty
 John Simm, actor known for DCI Sam Tyler in Life on Mars

Nelson Secondary Technical School
 Eric Knowles, antiques expert on Antiques Roadshow

Notes and references

External links 

Marsden Heights Community College website
BBC article on merging of schools in Pendle & Burnley

Defunct schools in Lancashire
Schools in the Borough of Pendle
Nelson, Lancashire